Antorides was a painter of ancient Greece. He was a contemporary with Euphranor, and, like him, a pupil of Aristo. He flourished about 340 BC.

Notes

Ancient Greek painters
4th-century BC painters